Dying Inside is a 1972 science fiction novel by Robert Silverberg.

Dying Inside may also refer to:

Songs
"Dying Inside", by Brandon Paris Band from On My Own, 2006
"Dying Inside", by the Cranberries from Wake Up and Smell the Coffee, 2001
"Dying Inside", by Death Before Dishonor from Friends Family Forever, 2005
"Dying Inside", by Gary Barlow from Since I Saw You Last, 2013
"Dying Inside", by Jerry Cantrell from Degradation Trip Volume 2, 2002
"Dying Inside", by Oppressor from Solstice of Oppression, 1994
"Dying Inside", by Saint Vitus from Born Too Late, 1986
"Dying Inside", by Sheer Greed from Sublime to the Ridiculous, 1992
"Dying Inside", by Suicide Commando from Stored Images, 1995
"Dying Inside", by World Is Static, 2007
"(Dying Inside) To Hold You", by Timmy Thomas, 1990
"Dying Inside To Hold You" by Darren Espanto, 2017

Other uses
"Dying Inside" (Strong Medicine), a 2005 television episode
Silent Hill: Dying Inside, a 2004 comic book series in the Silent Hill franchise

See also
Dead Inside (disambiguation)